Archery at the 1981 Southeast Asian Games was held at the Manila Polo Club from Dec 10 to Dec 13 1981.

Medal summary

Men's

Medal table

References

 https://eresources.nlb.gov.sg/newspapers/Digitised/Article/straitstimes19811212-1.2.148.2
 https://eresources.nlb.gov.sg/newspapers/Digitised/Article/straitstimes19811213-1.2.91
 https://eresources.nlb.gov.sg/newspapers/Digitised/Article/straitstimes19811214-1.2.122.5

Archery at the Southeast Asian Games
1981 Southeast Asian Games events
1981 in archery
Archery competitions in the Philippines